Neohymenopogon is a genus of flowering plants belonging to the family Rubiaceae.

Its native range is Central Himalayas to Southern Central China and Northern Indo-China.

Species
Species:

Neohymenopogon assamicus 
Neohymenopogon oligocarpus 
Neohymenopogon parasiticus

References

Rubiaceae
Rubiaceae genera